Hypolimnas bartelotti is a butterfly in the family Nymphalidae. It is found from Cameroon to the Democratic Republic of the Congo and in western Uganda.

References

Butterflies described in 1890
bartelotti
Butterflies of Africa